Bagerhat Government High School is a public secondary school located in the heart of Bagerhat town in Bagerhat Sadar Upazila, Bangladesh. It was established as Nurul Amin School in 1947 by getting help from the British Government. In 1967, the school became a government high school. After the liberation war, the previous name was removed and it holds its current name as Bagerhat Government Secondary School. This school has two shifts and enrollment of approximately 2,000 students.

Alumni
 Mahmood Hossain, mangrove ecologist and university administrator, completed his SSC in 1987.

References

 https://bagerhatgovtsecondaryschool.jessoreboard.gov.bd/
 https://www.facebook.com/BGHS.1947/

High schools in Bangladesh
Educational institutions established in 1947
1947 establishments in East Pakistan